Franz Anton Maichelbeck (6 July 1702 – 14 June 1750) was a German organist and composer.

Life 
He studied theology in Freiburg from 1721 and was sent to Rome on 27 September 1725 to study church music. In 1727/1728 he was appointed organist and cathedral kapellmeister at the Freiburg Cathedral. Later he was appointed by prince bishop Johann Franz Schenk von Stauffenberg as HofKapellmeister in Augsburg.

Anton died in Freiburg im Breisgau at age 47.

Publications and works 
1738: Die auf dem Clavier lehrende Caecilia, welche guten Unterricht ertheilet
1724: Requiem für Kaiser Karl VI. und Messe zu Ehren der Hl. Scholastika

Further reading 
 Christoph Schmider: Franz Anton Maichelbeck (1702–1750) und die Kirchenmusik in Freiburg. I: Freiburger Diözesan-Archiv. 124. year 2004, .
 Manfred Schuler, Christoph Schmider: Der Freiburger Münsterorganist Franz Anton Maichelbeck (1702–1750) und sein Requiem für Kaiser Karl VI. In Christoph Schmider (publisher): Musik am Freiburger Münster. Rombach, Freiburg im Breisgau 2002,

External links

References 

German classical organists
Sacred music composers
German Baroque composers
German male organists
Organists and composers in the South German tradition
1702 births
1750 deaths
People from Konstanz
Male classical organists